John Deng (born 29 July 1952) is a politician in the Republic of China (Taiwan). He was the Minister of Economic Affairs since 8 December 2014 until 20 May 2016.

Early life
Deng obtained his bachelor's degree in law from Soochow University, and his master's degree in law from George Washington University in the United States.

Economic affairs ministry

Ministry appointment
Upon his appointment to the position of Minister of Ministry of Economic Affairs on 5 December 2014, Deng laid out goals he would work towards during his appointed ministerial term. He said that he would strive to boost the competitiveness of Taiwan's industries, explore the Chinese mainland and international markets and improve the lives of the Taiwanese people. He added that clear objectives were needed to boost Taiwan's competitiveness, which included better promoting Taiwan's product in Mainland China and elsewhere, thus he would push the ministry for free trade deals with other countries.

Electricity conservation
In July 2015, Deng called on public and business sectors to conserve electricity when reserved capacity reached to a level of only 670 MW.

Second term as minister without portfolio
Tsai Ing-wen named Deng minister without portfolio in charge of trade negotiations for the Lin Chuan Cabinet in August 2016.

References

1952 births
Living people
Politicians of the Republic of China on Taiwan from Yilan County, Taiwan
Representatives of Taiwan to the United States